The Zygaenoidea comprise the superfamily of moths that includes burnet moths, forester moths, and relatives.

The families are:
 Aididae
 Anomoeotidae
 Cyclotornidae 
 Dalceridae 
 Epipyropidae 
 Heterogynidae 
 Himantopteridae 
 Lacturidae 
 Limacodidae 
 Megalopygidae 
 Phaudidae
 Somabrachyidae 
 Zygaenidae

References
Firefly Encyclopedia of Insects and Spiders, edited by Christopher O'Toole, 2002
Tree of Life: Zygaenoidea

 
Lepidoptera superfamilies